Zaplyvino is a rural locality (a selo) in Tundrikhinsky Selsoviet, Zalesovsky District, Altai Krai, Russia. The population was 214 as of 2013. There are 6 streets.

Geography 
Zaplyvino is located 15 km southwest of Zalesovo (the district's administrative centre) by road. Ust-Kamenka is the nearest rural locality.

References 

Rural localities in Zalesovsky District